Catfish and the Bottlemen are a British indie rock band formed in Llandudno, Wales, in 2007. The band's debut album, The Balcony, reached number 10 in the UK Albums Chart and achieved Platinum status on 30 December 2016. The band have toured in South America, Japan, UK, Europe, North America, and Australia performing a wide selection of festivals including Lollapalooza, Glastonbury, Latitude, Falls Festival, Community Festival, Reading and Leeds, T in the Park, Governors Ball, All Points East, Bonnaroo, Splendour in the Grass, and TRNSMT. They won a Brit Award for British Breakthrough Act on 24 February 2016. On 27 May 2016, they released their second album, The Ride, which reached number 1 in the UK Albums Chart and has sold 300,000 units in the UK since its release. On 26 April 2019, they released their third album, The Balance, which reached number 2 in the UK Albums Chart.

History

2007–2013: Formation and early years 
Catfish and the Bottlemen, formerly known as "The Prestige", were founded in May 2007, when Ryan Evan "Van" McCann and Billy Bibby began playing guitar together at Bibby's parents home, a bed and breakfast in Llandudno, Wales. McCann's parents also ran a bed and breakfast in Llandudno. Van was a friend of Bibby's younger brother Stephen, which is how McCann and Bibby met. McCann and Bibby were joined by Benji Blakeway on bass as the third founding member of the band. Schoolmate Jon Barr followed shortly thereafter on drums. Bibby, who had been playing guitar since age 10, taught both McCann and Blakeway how to play.

They promoted themselves by playing in support slots to friends' bands, such as Northwich's The Shallow Call, and by playing in car parks after other artists' gigs, including bands such as Kasabian. Steve Lamacq first played an early demo on BBC Radio 6 Music in March 2009. During 2009, Catfish were runners up in the 'North Wales Battle of the Bands', run by Gareth Thomas, having been beaten to the post by another local band The Fides who later closed the Conwy River Festival.

Original drummer Jon Barr was replaced by Bob Hall in 2010. Hall was introduced to the band by North Wales-based producer Russ Hayes who was working with the band at the time.

McCann met future band member Johnny Bond at Ravenstonedale festival in 2011, when the latter was a member of the band Symphonic Pictures. Bond later joined the band in 2014.

The band derives its name from McCann's first childhood musical memory: that of an Australian street busker in Sydney, playing beer bottles strung to a wire who goes by the name Catfish the Bottleman. He was called "Catfish" because of an unusually styled spiky beard he had when he first began playing in 2000. McCann was reunited with Catfish the Bottleman in January 2015 at the studios of Triple J radio in Sydney.

2013–2016: The Balcony 
The band signed to Communion Music in 2013, and released their first three singles "Homesick", "Rango", and "Pacifier" the same year. In 2014, the band signed to Island Records and on 17 March, released the single "Kathleen", produced by Jim Abbiss (Arctic Monkeys, Kasabian, Adele). All the singles were premiered by Zane Lowe and added to the playlist on Radio 1. "Kathleen" ranked at number one on MTV's hottest tracks in April 2014.

In summer 2014, Catfish and the Bottlemen performed at a number of festivals in the UK and Europe, including Reading and Leeds, Latitude, Kendal Calling, Y Not Festival, Strawberry Fields Festival, T in the Park, Pinkpop, Bingley Music Live, and Ibiza Rocks. They also played at New York's Governors Ball. On 19 June 2014, the band announced the release of their debut studio album The Balcony.

Founding lead guitarist Billy Bibby suddenly and unexpectedly ceased performing with the band in the summer of 2014. He was replaced by Johnny "Bondy" Bond. On 25 July 2014, the band cancelled three festival appearances due to "unforeseen personal circumstances". On 13 August 2014, the band posted on Facebook: "Some of you will have noticed that we have been playing with a different guitarist over the past weekend. Unfortunately, due to some personal circumstances, Billy won't be touring with the band for the foreseeable future."

When asked about leaving the band, Bibby commented, "Well to be honest after Catfish I had no plans. I didn't know what I was going to do. I just started writing songs and it took off from there..." and "I'm proud of what I did in Catfish and what I achieved and everything that came with it, but I'm just looking into the future now with my band and that's all I'm focused on". In autumn of 2015, he founded a new band, Billy Bibby & The Wry Smiles. 

The Balcony was released on 15 September 2014. Shortly afterwards, the band also announced a UK tour. The album charted at number 10 on the UK Albums Chart in the week ending 27 September 2014, was certified Silver in the UK on 9 January 2015, was certified Gold on 20 March 2015 and reached Platinum sales on 30 December 2016.

They won the BBC Introducing Award at the first BBC Music Awards in December 2014 and performed "Kathleen".

The Balcony was released in the US on 6 January 2015. The following day, the band performed on the Late Show with David Letterman.

In an interview with WOW247, McCann said that the band have "three albums written already". He continued to say that "I'm more excited for the second album than the first, because the workload is done now".

At the 2016 Brit Awards, the band won in the British Breakthrough Act category. They headlined Liverpool Sound City in May 2016, their first headline slot at a festival.

2016–2018: The Ride 

On 23 March 2016, the band announced via Twitter and Instagram that their second studio album would be entitled The Ride, which was released on 27 May 2016. On 3 June 2016, The Ride reached number one on the UK Albums Chart with unit sales of 38,000. On 8 July 2016, Catfish and the Bottlemen played their largest headlining show to date at Castlefield Bowl in Manchester, UK with Vant, Broken Hands, and Little Comets as support. On 1 July 2017, they headlined the first Community Festival in Finsbury Park, London.

2019–present: The Balance and Hall & Bond's departure
On 8 January 2019, the band released a new single entitled "Longshot", the lead single off their third studio album, The Balance. The album, along with artwork and tracklist, was officially announced on 25 January 2019. "Fluctuate", the second single from the album, was released on 13 February 2019.  "2all", the third single from the album, was released on 19 March 2019. "Conversation", the fourth and final single from the album, was released on 18 April 2019. The album was released on 26 April 2019. On 16 July 2019, a music video for "Conversation" was released, after the release of a Snapchat lens, which featured visuals from the music video.

In August 2021, the band headlined Reading and Leeds Festival for the first time. In September 2021, the band played Swansea's Singleton Park and held another headliner slot at Neighbourhood Weekender in Warrington. During September 2021, it was announced the band would be supporting Stereophonics at Cardiff's Millennium Stadium, alongside Tom Jones, on 18 December 2021. An additional date for 17 December 2021 was added after 'phenomenal' demand for tickets. The gigs were subsequently postponed due to COVID-19 restrictions in Wales, and were rescheduled to 17-18 June 2022. On 2 June 2022, it was announced via Stereophonics' twitter that the band would no longer be playing alongside them due to "unforeseen practical issues". 

On 29 September 2021, drummer Bob Hall announced via his Instagram that he would be leaving the band.

On 5 June 2022, following the announcement that the band would no longer play alongside Stereophonics, Johnny Bond also confirmed his departure from the band. In an Instagram statement, Bond stated that he actually took the decision to leave the band in March 2021 (he played at the four gigs in 2021 as a stand in session musician) and assumed the band would later confirm his departure, which they did not. Among other reasons for his departure, Bond stated that there had been reoccurring behaviour that he considered "intolerable" in the band, and that this had left him with "no choice" but to leave.

Musical style
When reviewing The Balcony, Scott Kerr of AllMusic likened the band's sound to that of Johnny Marr, The Cribs, Feeder and Mystery Jets. According to Ben Homewood of NME, McCann's vocal style is similar to The Kooks' frontman Luke Pritchard. With respect to the musical approach to The Ride, McCann has stated, "I feel like everybody started thinking too outside the box trying to be arty and different. We wanted to stay inside the box."

Following the release of The Balance, Catfish and the Bottlemen came under some criticism for having a ‘formulaic’ approach to song-writing.

Band members

Current members
 Van McCann – lead vocals, rhythm guitar (2007–present)
 Benji Blakeway – bass guitar, backing vocals (2007–present)

Former members
 Jon Barr – drums, percussion (2007–2010)
 Billy Bibby – lead guitar, backing vocals (2007–2014)
 Johnny Bond – lead guitar, backing vocals (2014–2021)
 Bob Hall – drums, percussion (2010–2021)

Timeline

Personal life 
Ryan Evan "Van" McCann was born in Australia. Van McCann, Benji Blakeway, guitar tech Larry Lau, and former members Bob Hall and Billy Bibby grew up in Llandudno, North Wales.

Blakeway is from Llandudno, Wales. Hall is from Sheffield, England. Bibby is from Lancashire, England. They all moved to Llandudno when they were "kids at the age of about 2 or 3".

McCann and Blakeway, along with former member Bibby, attended Ysgol John Bright in Llandudno. Drummer Bob Hall attended Rydal Penrhos School.

Johnny Bond is from Newcastle upon Tyne, England.

McCann calls himself Van after his and his father's musical hero Van Morrison.

McCann is a supporter of Manchester United. Blakeway supports Liverpool FC.

Concert tours
The Balcony Tour 
The Ride Tour 
Revolution Radio Tour 
The Balance Tour

Discography

Studio albums

EPs

Singles

Other charted and certified songs

Awards and nominations

References

External links
Official website

 
Musical groups established in 2007
2007 establishments in Wales
Brit Award winners
Welsh indie rock groups
Musical quartets